Tower in the Fountain of Sparks is the first studio album by the rock band Airport 5. It was released in 2001.

Track listing

All songs written by Robert Pollard and Tobin Sprout except where noted.

"Burns Carpenter, Man Of Science" – 3.40
"Total Exposure" – 4.08
"Subatomic Rain" – 2.52
"One More" – 2.55
"Mission Experiences" – 1.31
"The Cost Of Shipping Cattle" – 4.51
"Circle Of Trim" – 2.39
"War & Wedding" – 2.15
"Stifled Man Casino" – 3.21
"Up The Nails" – 3.37
"Tomorrow You May Rise" – 1.05
"Feathering Clueless (The Exotic Freebird)" – 3.02
"Mansfield On The Sky" – 3.37
"White Car Creek" – 1.02 (written by Tobin Sprout)
"Remain Lodging (At Airport 5)" – 3.44

References

2001 debut albums